Abdelkrim Merry (born 13 January 1955), nicknamed Krimau, is a Moroccan former professional footballer who played as a striker.

Club career
Born in Casablanca, Morocco, Krimau spent his entire professional career in France, reaching the 1978 UEFA Cup Final with SC Bastia.

International career
Krimau was part of the Morocco national team's squad at the 1986 FIFA World Cup, and scored one goal in a 3–1 win against Portugal. In 13 international matches from 1976 to 1989, Krimau scored five goals.

Coaching career
In the summer of 2012, Krimau started his coaching career with Olympique Marrakech.

Retirement
Krimau appears every week in a TV Show called Prolongation on Arryadia TV.

References

1955 births
Living people
Moroccan footballers
Footballers from Casablanca
Association football forwards
Morocco international footballers
1986 African Cup of Nations players
1988 African Cup of Nations players
1986 FIFA World Cup players
Ligue 1 players
Ligue 2 players
SC Bastia players
Lille OSC players
Toulouse FC players
FC Metz players
RC Strasbourg Alsace players
Tours FC players
Le Havre AC players
AS Saint-Étienne players
Racing Club de France Football players
Moroccan expatriate footballers
Expatriate footballers in France
Moroccan expatriate sportspeople in France